Akowonjo is a semi-urban community in ShaSha, Lagos State, Nigeria. The Akowonjos are Egbas who derived their title due to being a tenant to Shasha. Akowonjo happens to have bought the land from AKINLOWO family. It comes under the Alimosho local government area of Lagos state. It is populated and dominated by Aworis and non-indigenous people. Shasha as initially mentioned comprises thirty-eight major settlements such as Omititun, Oguntade, Santo, Afonka, Sanni Olopa, ShaSha Ilupeju, Jayeoba, Abule Ketu, Banmeke, Abule Awori, Abule Williams, Ajegunle, Akowonjo and many more.

S

Skills & Ideas Development Initiatives (SKIDI); a Small and Medium Sized Enterprises powered Incorporated Trustee organisation is located at Akowonjo.

Mini Gallery

Populated places in Lagos State
Communities in Yorubaland